There are many mixed rice dishes in cuisines around the world. Mixed rice combines rice with various meats, vegetables, and spices. The resulting dish is often eaten as the main portion of the meal, although it can be served as a side.

North America 
Jambalaya (Louisiana)

Hoppin' John (Southern United States)

Rice and peas (Caribbean)

South America 
Latin American offers many types of mixed rice dishes:

Arroz con Pollo

Arroz con gandules 

Gallo Pinto

Pabellón criollo

Platillo Moros y Cristianos

Rice and beans

Spanish rice (Mexico)

Africa 
Bariis iskukaris (Somalia)

Jollof rice (West Africa)

Kushari (Egypt)

Asia 
Arroz a la valenciana (Philippines)

Bibimbap (Korea)

Biryani (various forms exist in Bangladesh, India, and Pakistan)

Donburi (Japan)

Takikomi gohan (Japan)

Nasi campur (Indonesia)

Nasi Goreng (Indonesia)

Economy rice (Southeast Asia)

Fried Rice (East Asia)

Pongal (India)

Khichdi  (India)

Bisi bele bath (India)

Kabsa (Saudi Arabia)

Europe 
Arroz de Cabidela (Portugal)

Ghapama (Armenia)

Kedgeree (United Kingdom)

Paella (Spain)

Risotto (Italy)

See also 
 List of rice dishes

Rice dishes